Adèle de Ponthieu is the name of several French operas set to the same libretto:
Adèle de Ponthieu (1772) by La Borde and Berton
Adèle de Ponthieu (1781) by Piccinni
Adèle de Ponthieu (1887) by André Wormser